The following events occurred in May 1924:

May 1, 1924 (Thursday)
The German military suppressed attempts to hold May Day demonstrations all over the country. 8 died and hundreds were wounded.
The Whampoa Military Academy officially opened in China.
Born: Art Fleming, actor and television host, in New York City (d. 2005); Grégoire Kayibanda, President of Rwanda, in Tare, Rwanda (d. 1976); Terry Southern, writer, in Alvarado, Texas (d. 1995)

May 2, 1924 (Friday)
U.S. President Coolidge issued an arms embargo on Cuba at the request of its government.
Born: Jamal Abro, writer, in Sangeen Taluka Mehar, Pakistan (d. 2004)

May 3, 1924 (Saturday)
In Argentina, 150,000 workers participated in a general strike protesting the paying of 5 percent of their wages into a fund for old-age pensions.
The "Bozenhardt incident" occurred in Berlin when German police raided the Soviet Trade Delegation.

May 4, 1924 (Sunday)
The Summer Olympics preliminary competitions began in Paris, France, although the official opening ceremony was not held until July 5.
The German federal election was held. The Social Democratic Party of Germany narrowly maintained its plurality in the Reichstag; the German National People's Party finished second.
Among the new Reichstag electees was Erich Ludendorff, who ran under the banner of the National Socialist Freedom Movement, a stand-in for the Nazi Party which was banned at the time.
Soviet officials said the Bozenhardt incident would have serious consequences unless Germany apologized and paid reparations.
The film Men, starring Pola Negri, was released.
Real Unión defeated Real Madrid, 1 to 0, to win the 24th Copa del Rey football championship.
Died: E. Nesbit, 65, English author

May 5, 1924 (Monday)
The Cuban rebellion spread to Oriente Province.
Died: Kate Claxton, 75, American stage actress

May 6, 1924 (Tuesday)
The Soviet Union suspended trade with Germany as it had not received satisfaction over the Bozenhardt incident.
Macedonian separatists presented the May Manifesto.
The Batley Bulldogs defeated the Wigan Warriors 13–7 to win the Northern Rugby Football League championship.
The strike in Argentina ended in victory for the workers.

May 7, 1924 (Wednesday)
In the Ruhr region of Germany, 300,000 miners went on strike over working hours.

The first issue of Liberty magazine, with a cover date of May 10, appeared on newsstands. The weekly general-interest magazine would decline in popularity, becoming a monthly magazine and ceasing publication until July 1950. 
Died: Dimitar Blagoev, 67, Bulgarian political leader

May 8, 1924 (Thursday)
The Klaipėda Convention was signed.
Federico Laredo Brú, leader of the short-lived Cuban rebellion, negotiated the terms of his surrender.

May 9, 1924 (Friday)
U.S. President Coolidge's attempt to delay the controversial immigration bill until March 1, 1925, was defeated in the House of Representatives by a vote of 191 to 171. 
A home rule bill for Scotland was introduced by George Buchanan into the British House of Commons, but the debate degenerated into a shouting match that the Speaker of the House adjourned the session for the day.

May 10, 1924 (Saturday)
Japan held an election for the 464 seats of its House of Representatives. The Seiyuhonto and Seiyukai combined to form a coalition government led by Katō Takaaki. Episodes of rioting were reported around the country.

J. Edgar Hoover, a 29-year-old lawyer, became the Director of the Bureau of Investigation, the predecessor to the Federal Bureau of Investigation (FBI). He would direct the FBI for the next 48 years use the bureau to gather information on his political enemies.
The German drama film Mountain of Destiny was released.
A cave-in trapped five miners in the Black Iron Mine near Gilman, Colorado.
Born: Zahrad, poet, in Constantinople, Turkey (d. 2007)

May 11, 1924 (Sunday)
The dedication of a restored monument to Helmuth von Moltke in Halle, Saxony, Germany turned into a violent confrontation in which eight people died.
A legislative election was held in France in which left-wing parties made large gains. 
Volcanic activity at Kīlauea in Hawaii began to increase.
Born: Antony Hewish, British radio astronomer and recipient of the Nobel Prize in Physics (d. 2021)
Died: Moses Fleetwood Walker, 67, African-American baseball player

May 12, 1924 (Monday)
French Prime Minister Raymond Poincaré, taking the election results as a defeat, said he would resign once the newly elected deputies took their seats in June.
Nellie Morse became the fourth and last filly to win the Preakness Stakes.
The Soviet Union began a boycott of Germany over the Bozenhardt incident.
Two government-owned liquor stores opened in Alberta, ending Prohibition in that Canadian province after eight years.
Born: Tony Hancock, comedian and actor, in Hall Green, Birmingham, England (d. 1968)

May 13, 1924 (Tuesday)
The five miners in the Colorado cave-in were rescued after 80 hours.
Crowds in Moscow hanged effigies of Gustav Stresemann and Raymond Poincaré during a protest against the Bozenhardt incident.
Died: Louis Hirsch, 36, songwriter (pneumonia)

May 14, 1924 (Wednesday)
In Springfield, Massachusetts, the Methodist general conference committee voted 76 to 37 to recommend to the conference that the Methodist church never again as an organization participate in any kind of warfare under any circumstances, not even self-defense. An amendment to make an exception for wars to save the country and help humanity was tabled.

May 15, 1924 (Thursday)
President Coolidge vetoed the "Bonus Bill".
Born: Maria Koepcke, orthinologist, in Germany (d. 1971)
Died: Paul-Henri-Benjamin d'Estournelles de Constant, 71, French diplomat and recipient of the Nobel Peace Prize; Ed Swartwood, 65, American baseball player

May 16, 1924 (Friday)
A Labour government bill to nationalize Britain's coal mining industry was defeated 264 to 168 when the Liberals refused to support it. It was first attempt by the Ramsay MacDonald government to introduce truly socialist legislation.
Born: Dawda Jawara, 1st President of the Gambia, in Barajally, Gambia (d. 2019)

May 17, 1924 (Saturday)
The House of Representatives voted 313–78 to pass the veterans' bonus bill over Coolidge's veto, sending it to a vote in the Senate.
Black Gold won the 1924 Kentucky Derby.
People living near the Kīlauea volcano in Hawaii began to evacuate as a huge eruption appeared imminent.
The three planes trying to fly around the world completed the longest and most hazardous leg of their journey, flying from Attu Island in Alaska to Paramashiru in the Kurils.

May 18, 1924 (Sunday)
Kīlauea volcano experienced a massive explosive eruption.
Born: Priscilla Pointer, actress, in New York City (alive in 2021)

May 19, 1924 (Monday)
The United States passed the World War Adjusted Compensation Act when the Senate voted 59–26 to override President Coolidge's veto.
The new Marx Brothers stage show I'll Say She Is opened on Broadway.
The first aerial circumnavigation of Australia was carried out by an RAAF crew in a Fairey IIID.
Born: Sandy Wilson, composer and lyricist, in Sale, Greater Manchester, England (d. 2014)

May 20, 1924 (Tuesday)
Over a million radio listeners in the United Kingdom listened in on an experimental broadcast from a garden in Surrey in which a nightingale's song was picked up by a microphone concealed in a bush. Cellist Beatrice Harrison played a few soft notes in the garden until the nightingale joined in. It has since been suggested, however, that the "nightingale" was actually the work of a bird impressionist.

May 21, 1924 (Wednesday)
Many were wounded in Gelsenkirchen during rioting over the Ruhr miners' strike. Belgian troops and German police fought a mob trying to prevent emergency employees from working in the mines.
Fourteen-year-old Bobby Franks, son of the millionaire head of a watch manufacturer, disappeared while walking home from school in the Kenwood area of Chicago.
Babe Ruth joined the New York Guard.

May 22, 1924 (Thursday)
The Concerto for Piano and Wind Instruments by Igor Stravinsky premiered at the Opera of Paris.
Bobby Franks' wealthy parents received a ransom note demanding $10,000, but the boy's body was found near Wolf Lake before any money was paid.
The airmen trying to fly around the world landed at Kasumigaura, Japan where they were welcomed by Japanese military commanders and schoolchildren waving American flags.
Born: Charles Aznavour, French-Armenian singer, actor and songwriter, in Paris (d. 2018)

May 23, 1924 (Friday)
French authorities notified owners of mines in the Ruhr that occupying forces would seize their coal if the strike continued.

May 24, 1924 (Saturday)
The United States passed the Rogers Act.
Born: Vincent Cronin, historical writer and biographer, in Tredegar, England (now Wales) (d. 2011)

May 25, 1924 (Sunday)
Beulah Annan was acquitted of murder in her sensationalized trial in Chicago.

May 26, 1924 (Monday)
The Johnson–Reed Act, officially the U.S. Immigration Act of 1924, was signed into law by U.S. President Calvin Coolidge to restrict the entry of non-white foreigners into the United States. The Act included the Asian Exclusion Act and National Origins Act (Pub.L. 68–139, 43 Stat. 153), which prevented immigration from Asia and set quotas on the number of immigrants from the Eastern Hemisphere. The Act also authorized the formation of the U.S. Border Patrol was authorized by the act. The broad discrimination against Asians would become one of the factors in spurring Japan against its former allies and eventually into World War II.   
The cabinet of German Chancellor Wilhelm Marx resigned as he failed to form a new government.
Canada explained why it was defying the British government's wishes by refusing to ratify the Treaty of Lausanne until it was submitted to Parliament for a vote on it, saying Canada had not been invited to the conference that drafted it.
Died: Victor Herbert, 65, Irish-born, German-raised American composer and conductor

May 27, 1924 (Tuesday)
German President Friedrich Ebert offered the Chancellorship to Oskar Hergt, but Hergt voiced too many reservations about the Dawes Plan and so Ebert asked Wilhelm Marx to make another attempt to form a government.
A lively new session of the Reichstag opened. When Erich Ludendorff was announced, communists heckled him with cries such as "mass murderer". The session was adjourned after communists stood and sang "The Internationale" and nationalists countered with "Deutschland über alles".
The English High Court granted an injunction to the investors of Harry Grindell Matthews, forbidding him from selling the rights to his "death ray" without their consent.

May 28, 1924 (Wednesday)
The government of Japan approved a formal protest to the United States over the Immigration Act.
The League of Nations demanded the secret of Harry Grindell Matthews' death ray.

May 29, 1924 (Thursday)
A munitions depot exploded two miles west of Bucharest. The city-shaking explosion caused many deaths and damaged the royal palace.
Nathan Leopold Jr. and Richard Loeb were separately questioned by police about the murder of Bobby Franks.
Comedian and actor Frank Tinney was arrested in New York City for assaulting Ziegfeld Follies dancer Imogene Wilson.
Born: Lars Bo, Danish artist and writer (d. 1999); Lavon "Pepper" Paire Davis, baseball player, in Los Angeles (d. 2013)

May 30, 1924 (Friday)
Italian socialist politician Giacomo Matteotti made an impassioned speech criticizing the way the election of the previous month had been conducted and saying it had no validity due to the Fascist tactics of intimidating voters and candidates. His speech was shouted down by Fascists with cries such as "villain" and "traitor".
Born: Turk Lown, baseball player, in Brooklyn, New York (d. 2016)

May 31, 1924 (Saturday)
Nathan Leopold Jr. and Richard Loeb confessed to the murder of Bobby Franks. They said they did it "for the experience, through a spirit of adventure."
Died: Charles Stockton, 78, American admiral

References

1924
1924-05
1924-05